Handycam is a Sony brand used to market its camcorder range.  It was launched in 1985 as the name of the first Video8 camcorder, replacing Sony's previous line of Betamax-based models, and the name was intended to emphasize the "handy" palm size nature of the camera, made possible by the new miniaturized tape format.  This was in marked contrast to the larger, shoulder mounted cameras available before the creation of Video8, and competing smaller formats such as VHS-C.

Formats 
Sony has continued to produce Handycams  in a variety of guises ever since, developing the Video8 format to produce Hi8 (equivalent to S-VHS quality) and later Digital8, using the same basic format to record digital video. The Handycam label continues to be applied as recording formats evolve.

Functionality

Night vision 
Select flagship Sony HandyCam models feature infrared night-vision, dubbed NightShot which utilizes an infrared light-emitting diode and an infrared filter that is mechanically attached, and detached to the sensor in order to enable the camcorder to record video footage in complete darkness ("Nightshot 0 lux").

The NightShot feature is popular with paranormal investigators on the Travel Channel's Ghost Adventures.

Meta data 
MiniDV tape Handycam camcorders record a time code and video recording parameters (such as light sensitivity (in dB), aperture, exposure time) on an additional meta data track on the tape.

Models

Video8 Handycam (1985-1989) (These continued for sale into the 90s)

Hi8 Handycam (1989-2007)
Digital8 Handycam (1999-2007)
DV Handycam (1995-)
HDV Handycam
DVD-Handycam 
HDD Handycam
Memory Stick Handycam (using Memory Stick Pro Duo. Up to 16GB)
SD Card Handycam (with or without internal flash memory)
4K Handycam

See also 
AVCHD
Camcorder
List of Sony trademarks

External links
 Handycam website of Sony Middle East and Africa
 Handycam Camcorder page of Sony Singapore
 http://www.sony-asia.com/microsite/handycam/

References

Sony camcorders